Church of Santa María may refer to:

 Church of Santa María (Fuenmayor), Spain
 Church of Santa María (Cogolludo), Spain
 Church of Santa María (Lebeña), Spain
 Church of Santa María (Salvatierra), Spain
 Church of Santa María (Arcos de la Frontera), Spain
 Church of Santa María (Ateca), Spain